André Deryckere (19 November 1928 — 5 December 2019) was a Belgian sailor and judge. He competed in the Dragon event at the 1952 Summer Olympics in Helsinki, Finland. He worked at the family business of the Deryckere family, the clothes shop Caddy-Tailors. Later, he became a judge at the Commercial Tribunal Ostend-Bruges, from 1991 to 1997 he presided over the tribunal.

Personal life
Deryckere married Brigitte Hollebecq (born 19 September 1932) from Mouscron and had five children.

References

External links

1928 births
2019 deaths
Belgian male sailors (sport)
Olympic sailors of Belgium
Sailors at the 1952 Summer Olympics – Dragon
Sportspeople from Ostend
20th-century Belgian judges